Umm al-Fahm (Umm al-Faḥm;  Um el-Faḥem) is a city located  northwest of Jenin in the Haifa District of Israel. The city is situated on the Umm al-Fahm mountain ridge, the highest point of which is Mount Iskander ( above sea level), overlooking Wadi Ara. Umm al-Fahm is the social, cultural and economic center for residents of the Wadi Ara and Triangle regions.

Etymology
Umm al-Fahm means "Mother of Charcoal" in Arabic. According to local lore, the village was surrounded by forests which were used to produce charcoal.

History
Several archaeological sites around the city date to the Iron Age II, as well as the Persian, Hellenistic, Roman, early Muslim and the Middle Ages.

Mamluk era
In 1265 C.E. (663 H.), after Baybars won the territory from the Crusaders, the revenues from Umm al-Fahm were given to the Mamluk na'ib al-saltana (viceroy) of Syria, Jamal al-Din al-Najibi.

Ottoman era
In 1517 the village was incorporated into the Ottoman Empire with the rest of Palestine, and in 1596 it appeared in the tax registers as being in the Nahiya of Sara of the Liwa of Lajjun.  It had a population of 24 households, all Muslim, and paid taxes on wheat, barley, summer crops, olive trees, occasional revenues, goats and/or beehives, and a press for olive oil or grape syrup.

In 1838, Edward Robinson recorded Umm al-Fahm on his travels, and again in 1852, when he noted that there were 20 to 30 Christian families in the village.

In 1870, Victor Guérin found it had 1800 inhabitants and was surrounded by beautiful gardens.

In 1872, Charles Tyrwhitt-Drake noted that Umm al-Fahm was  "divided into four-quarters, El Jebarin, El Mahamin, El Maj’ahineh, and El Akbar’iyeh, each of which has its own sheikh."

In 1883, the Palestine Exploration Fund's Survey of Western Palestine described Umm al-Fahm as having around 500 inhabitants, of which some 80 people were Christians. The place was well-built of stone, and the villagers were described as being very rich in cattle, goats and horses. It was the most important place in the area besides Jenin. The village was divided into four-quarters, el Jebarin, el Mahamin, el Mejahineh, and el Akbariyeh, each quarter having its own sheikh. A maqam for a Sheikh Iskander was noted on a hill above; Conder and Kitchener wrote that the village's Qadi said Sheikh Iskander was a king of the children of Israel, while others saw it as a maqam dedicated for Alexander the Great.

British Mandate era
In the 1922 census of Palestine, conducted by the British Mandate authorities, Umm al-Fahm had a population of 2,191; 2,183 Muslims and 8 Christians, increasing in the 1931 census to 2443; 2427 Muslim and 16 Christians, in 488 inhabited houses.

Umm al-Fahm was the birthplace of Palestinian Arab rebel leader Yusuf Hamdan. He died there in 1939 during a firefight with British troops.

In the 1945 statistics the population was counted together with other Arab villages from the Wadi Ara region, the first two of which are today part of Umm al-Fahm, namely Aqqada, Ein Ibrahim, Khirbat el Buweishat, al-Murtafi'a, Lajjun, Mu'awiya, Musheirifa and Musmus. The total population was 5,490; 5,430 Muslims and 60 Christians, with 77,242 dunams of land, according to the official land and population survey. 4332 dunams were used for plantations and irrigable land, 44,586 dunams for cereals, while 128 dunams were built-up (urban) land.

State of Israel

In 1948, there were 4,500 inhabitants, mostly farmers, in the Umm al-Fahm area. After the 1948 Arab–Israeli War, the Lausanne Conference of 1949 awarded the entire Little Triangle to Israel, which wanted it for security purposes. On 20 May 1949, the city's leader signed an oath of allegiance to the State of Israel. Following its absorption into Israel, the town's population grew rapidly (see box). By 1960, Umm al-Fahm was given local council status by the Israeli government. Between 1965 and 1985, it was governed by elected councils. In 1985, Umm al-Fahm was granted official city status.

In October 2010, a group of 30 right-wing activists led by supporters of the banned Kach movement clashed with protesters in Umm al-Fahm. Many policemen and protesters were injured in the fray.

Local government
The growing influence of fundamentalist Islam has been noted by several scholars.

Since the 1990s, the municipality has been run by the Northern Islamic Movement. Ex-mayor Sheikh Raed Salah was arrested in 2003 on charges of raising millions of dollars for Hamas. He was freed after two years in prison. Sheikh Hashem Abd al-Rahman was elected mayor in 2003. He was replaced in November 2008 by Khaled Aghbariyya.
Today the mayor is Dr. Samir Sobhi Mahamed.

Because of the proximity to the border of the West Bank, the city is named very often as a possible candidate for a land-swap in a peace treaty with the Palestinians to compensate land used by Jewish settlements. In a survey of Umm al-Fahm residents conducted by and published in the Israeli-Arab weekly Kul Al-Arab in July 2000, 83% of respondents opposed the idea of transferring their city to Palestinian jurisdiction. The proposal by Avigdor Lieberman for a population exchange was rejected by Israeli Arab politicians as ethnic cleansing.

Economy
Since the establishment of Israel, Umm al-Fahm has gone from being a village to an urban center that serves as a hub for the surrounding villages. Most breadwinners make their living in the building sector. The remainder work mostly in clerical or self-employed jobs, though a few small factories have been built over the years. According to CBS, there were 5,843 salaried workers and 1,089 self-employed in 2000. The mean monthly wage in 2000 for a salaried worker was NIS 2,855, a real change of 3.4% over the course of 2000. Salaried males had a mean monthly wage of NIS 3,192 (a real change of 4.6%) versus NIS 1,466 for females (a real change of −12.6%). The mean income for the self-employed was 4,885. 488 residents received unemployment benefits and 4,949 received an income guarantee. In 2007, the city had an unofficial 31 percent poverty rate.

Haat Delivery is a food-delivery start-up based in Umm al-Fahm. The service was launched in 2020 and handles tens of thousands of orders a month.

Education
According to CBS, there are a total of 17 schools and 9,106 students in the city: 15 elementary and 4 junior high-schools for more than 5,400 elementary school students, and 7 high schools for more than 3,800 high school students. In 2001, 50.4% of 12th grade students received a Bagrut matriculation certificate.

Arts and culture

The Umm al-Fahm Art Gallery was established in 1996 as a venue for contemporary art exhibitions and a home for original Arab and Palestinian art. The gallery operates under the auspices of the El-Sabar Association. Yoko Ono held an exhibition there in 1999, and some of her art is still on show. The gallery offers classes to both Arab and Jewish children and exhibits the work of both Arab and Jewish artists. In 2007, the municipality granted the gallery a large plot of land on which the Umm al-Fahm Museum of Contemporary Art will be built.

Green Carpet is an association established by the residents to promote local tourism and environmental projects in and around Umm al-Fahm.

Sports
The city has several football clubs. Maccabi Umm al-Fahm currently play in Liga Leumit, the second tier of Israeli football. Hapoel Umm al-Fahm played in Liga Artzit (the third tier), prior to their folding in 2009. , Achva Umm al-Fahm play in Liga Bet (the fourth tier) and Bnei Umm al-Fahm play in Liga Gimel (the fifth tier).

Notable people
 Afu Agbaria (born 1949), member of the Knesset 
 Yousef Jabareen (born 1972), member of the Knesset 
 Mohammed Jamal Jebreen (born 1982), footballer
 Hashem Mahameed (born 1945), member of the Knesset 
 Anas Mahamid (born 1998), footballer

See also
Arab localities in Israel
List of Israeli cities
Demographics of Israel
Or Commission – the Commission of Inquiry into the Clashes Between Security Forces and Israeli Citizens in October 2000

References

Bibliography

Further reading
Maps, weather and information about Umm el Fahm
'We are all Umm El Fahm' Protests against land confiscation in an Umm El Fahm, November 1998, Issue No. 86 The Other Israel (newsletter of the Israeli Council for Israeli-Palestinian Peace)

External links
Official website
www.um-elfahem.net
Welcome To Umm al-Fahm
Survey of Western Palestine, Map 8: IAA, Wikimedia Commons

 
Arab localities in Israel
Cities in Haifa District
Cities in Israel
Triangle (Israel)